All Roads Lead Home is a 2008 drama film directed by Dennis Fallon and starring Peter Boyle, Patton Oswalt, Jason London, Vivien Cardone, Vanessa Branch, Peter Coyote, Garrett Smith, Stephen Milton, and Allan Kayser. It was released on September 25, 2008.

It was filmed in and around Kansas City, Missouri. The film had a World Premiere on January 27, 2008, at the Santa Barbara International Film Festival. The film has also recently been in several film festivals, and has received negative reviews.

Peter Boyle died before the movie's release.  It was the last movie that he appeared in and was dedicated to his memory.

Plot
The story is about a 12-year-old girl, Belle, who loses her mother in a car accident. She is sent to her grandfather's house for releasing all of the kennel dogs where her father works. When the animals start to get sick and die in Belle's hometown, her father's veterinarian girlfriend struggles to find out what is killing the healthy animals. When Belle's father and his girlfriend visit, Belle's dog attacks the grandfather's farmhand Basham. Because Belle is now running the farm, she decides the dog should be put to death because that is what she learned on the farm. Belle learns this after running away with one of her grandfather's horses, two puppies, and the dog she will later decide to euthanize. Belle almost dies while running away in the middle of a torrential downpour when she slips and falls and on a pair of railroad tracks while a train approaches. Luckily, Basham saves her. When the dog is about to die, it is discovered that the food Basham was carrying contained a lethal mold that was killing the animals. The vet goes to the factory where the food was made and fixes the problem, ending the dog epidemic. Then, Belle's rich grandfather has an inn turned into a no-kill animal shelter.

Awards
Winner of Best Feature Drama in the International Family Film Festival

References

External links 
 
 
 All Roads Lead Home Official Site

2008 films
2008 drama films
American drama films
Films about dogs
Films about families
Films about horses
2000s English-language films
2000s American films